Fyodorovka Airport is an abandoned airport, located in the North-Western part of Omsk, Russia. The airport was initially planned to be opened in 2016, as one of the gifts to Omsk's jubilee of 300 years.

History
The airport was initially decided to be built outside the boundaries of Omsk in 1979. The construction of the facility was constantly discontinued and resumed in 1996, 2001, 2005 and 2008. Years later it was planned to be commissioned for the 300th anniversary of Omsk, which was celebrated in 2016, but in 2012 it was announced that the work was being stopped.

Plans and current state
In July 2017, the airport was sold to airport operator Novaport, who decided to restart construction by investing 11 billion rubles over a course of three years. The airport is proposed to be built on a new site, rather than continue working on the previous long-lasting construction, which in recent years has become a venue for street racing auto-matches Currently, only plans, there were no official documents signed, but Novaport promises to finish the airport construction for three years. However in October 2017, Airports of Regions also brought its interest to take part in the airports construction. Due to the question of investment and the operator choice difficulty, on first quarter of 2018, the government of Omsk Oblast' will select the main investor into the project.

References

External links

 

Airports in Omsk Oblast
Novaport
Airports of Regions